The Warning is a 1980 Italian crime-giallo film directed by Damiano Damiani.

Plot 
The story takes place in Rome, Italy. During a delicate investigation into various personalities of the upper business and banking world, colluding with organized crime, the chief commissioner Vincenzo Laganà is killed in his office for not accepting a bribe of 200 million. Meanwhile, Commissioner Barresi is about to resign, after having found 100 million credited to his bank account and having received a phone call from unknown persons who clarify how he will have to behave during the investigation that will follow the assassination of Laganà.

After having followed the assassins in vain, Barresi makes an agreement with the commissioner to resolve the case. Silvia, Laganà's widow, is blackmailed by a woman who says she has proof that the deceased commissioner was a corrupt man: the blackmailers are arrested, however.

Barresi then questions Silvia and discovers that she had appropriated the bribe offered to her husband to bribe him, and manages to save her just a moment before the woman tries to commit suicide, desperate. At this point, Commissioner Barresi decides to play all out and go through with his investigation.

Cast 
Giuliano Gemma as Commissioner Antonio Baresi
Martin Balsam as  Quaestor Martorana
John Karlsen as  Ferdinando Violante
Guido Leontini as  Gianfranco Puma
 Laura Trotter as  Silvia Laganà
 Giancarlo Zanetti as  Prizzi
 Marcello Mandò as  Pastore
 Geoffrey Copleston as Prosecutor Vesce
 Vincent Gentile as  Ludovico Vella
 Elio Marconato as  Nicola Vella

Release
The Warning was released in Italy on August 15, 1980 where it was distributed by Cineriz. It grossed a total of 1.011 billion Italian lire on its theatrical run.

See also 
 List of Italian films of 1980

Notes

References

External links

1980 films
Films directed by Damiano Damiani
Italian thriller films
Poliziotteschi films
Films scored by Riz Ortolani
1980s Italian films